Paul C. Pribbenow is an American academic administrator, currently serving as the 10th president of Augsburg University in Minneapolis.

Education 
Pribbenow earned a Bachelor of Arts degree from Luther College, followed by a master's degree and PhD in social ethics from the University of Chicago.

Career 
Prior to joining Augsburg University, Pribbenow served as president of Rockford University from 2002 to 2006. He also served as research fellow, Dean for College Advancement, and secretary of the Board of Trustees at Wabash College. He was vice president of the School of the Art Institute of Chicago and associate dean of the University of Chicago Divinity School.

Pribbenow took office as president of Augsburg in 2006.

References 

Heads of universities and colleges in the United States
Augsburg University faculty
Luther College (Iowa) alumni
University of Chicago Divinity School faculty
University of Chicago alumni
Wabash College faculty
People from Minneapolis
Year of birth missing (living people)
Living people